The dolorous grass mouse or Córdoba akodont (Akodon dolores) is a species of rodent in the family Cricetidae.
It is found only in Argentina. It is an invertivore and can grow as large as 50.5g.

References

Akodon
Mammals of Argentina
Mammals described in 1916
Taxa named by Oldfield Thomas
Taxonomy articles created by Polbot